Damian Forder (born 11 March 1979) is an English cricketer. He is a right-handed batsman and a left-handed medium-pace bowler. At 6 foot 4 inches tall, he was lined up to replace Mike Smith after the Gloucestershire man retired.

However, the young bowler was unable to secure a place in the Gloucestershire side in 1999, and left inauspiciously two years later, along with Mike Cawdron, Tom Cotterell and Michael Sutliff.

External links
Damien Forder at CricketArchive 

1979 births
Forder, Damien
Forder, Damien
Gloucestershire Cricket Board cricketers